NSRC may refer to:

National Service Reserve Corps, a disaster response unit under the Philippines' Office of Civil Defense
National Sexuality Resource Center, an American organization advocating positive human sexuality representation 
Network Startup Resource Center, an American organization supporting Internet research and education networks
North Stratford Railroad, an American interstate railroad